 

Sir Brian Ernest Bell CSM, KBE, CStJ (3 July 192825 July 2010) was an Australian-born businessman who established a business empire in Papua New Guinea.

Early life

Bell studied pharmacy at the Brisbane Central Technical College, now the Queensland University of Technology. He moved to Port Moresby, Papua New Guinea in 1954 as a pharmaceutical chemist in the Bulk Medical Store and soon after established PNG's first electrical retail outlet.

Business career

Bell's business expanded rapidly and Brian Bell and Company was established in 1961. It included department stores, home centres, chemicals, cleaning products and industrial equipment. The Brian Bell Group of Companies is the largest business of its kind in PNG, generating revenue of 253 million Kina annually and employing 1300 staff.

Philanthropy and honours

Bell supported the Port Moresby General Hospital (where he was Chairman of the Board), the Red Cross and the Port Moresby City Mission. He also served as deputy lord mayor of Port Moresby, a member of the PNG lands board, the Salvation Army advisory board and the PNG law and order committee. He was at one time chairman of UPNG Foundation, the NCD South Pacific Festival of Arts and the Salvation Army Red Shield Appeal. Bell also served as patron of AIESEC PNG University. He set up a school outside Port Moresby, helped in offering scholarships and funded many needy and deserving young Papua New Guineans.

Bell was Honorary Consul General in Papua New Guinea for Norway and Sweden and was appointed a Knight of the Royal Norwegian Order of Merit and a Commander of the Order of the Polar Star (Sweden) for his service in those positions. He also received the PNG Community Service Medal, Queen's Jubilee Medal, PNG Independence Medal and the Salvation Army's Order of Distinguished Auxiliary Service.

Bell was appointed a Knight Commander of the Order of the British Empire (KBE) for his contributions to business and charity in Papua New Guinea's 1993 New Year's Day Honours List. He was appointed a Commander (Brother) of the Order of St John in 2004.

References

1928 births
2010 deaths
Australian emigrants to Papua New Guinea
Australian Knights Commander of the Order of the British Empire
Papua New Guinean Knights Commander of the Order of the British Empire
Commanders of the Order of St John
Commanders of the Order of the Polar Star
20th-century Papua New Guinean businesspeople
Queensland University of Technology alumni